Howick Ward is an Auckland Council ward which elects two councillors and covers the Howick Local Board. Sharon Stewart and Maurice Williamson are the current councillors.

Demographics

Howick ward had a population of 140,970 at the 2018 New Zealand census, an increase of 13,845 people (10.9%) since the 2013 census, and an increase of 27,465 people (24.2%) since the 2006 census. There were 43,587 households, comprising 69,399 males and 71,568 females, giving a sex ratio of 0.97 males per female. The median age was 37.3 years (compared with 37.4 years nationally), with 27,279 people (19.4%) aged under 15 years, 28,542 (20.2%) aged 15 to 29, 66,066 (46.9%) aged 30 to 64, and 19,086 (13.5%) aged 65 or older.

Ethnicities were 46.0% European/Pākehā, 5.7% Māori, 5.7% Pacific peoples, 46.5% Asian, and 3.9% other ethnicities. People may identify with more than one ethnicity.

The percentage of people born overseas was 53.1, compared with 27.1% nationally.

Although some people chose not to answer the census's question about religious affiliation, 42.2% had no religion, 35.8% were Christian, 0.3% had Māori religious beliefs, 6.3% were Hindu, 2.8% were Muslim, 3.4% were Buddhist and 4.0% had other religions.

Of those at least 15 years old, 33,936 (29.8%) people had a bachelor's or higher degree, and 13,800 (12.1%) people had no formal qualifications. The median income was $34,900, compared with $31,800 nationally. 22,953 people (20.2%) earned over $70,000 compared to 17.2% nationally. The employment status of those at least 15 was that 58,050 (51.1%) people were employed full-time, 15,138 (13.3%) were part-time, and 3,843 (3.4%) were unemployed.

Councillors 

(a)By-election result.

Election Results 
Election Results for the Howick Ward:

2022 Election Results

References

Wards of the Auckland Region